José Maria Pimentel (Luanda, June 23, 1956) is a Portuguese-Angolan writer and illustrator. He created the famous RTP1 character Vitinho.

Works
 Levante 1487 – A Vã Glória de João Álvares, 2010
 O Grande Livro do Vitinho, 2017
 Vitinho– Um dia eu vou ser grande!, 2017
 Vitinho – É a dormir que se cresce!, 2017
 Vitinho – Perigo! Zona de Acidentes!, 2018

References

External links

1956 births
Living people
Angolan writers
Angolan people of Portuguese descent
Angolan illustrators
Portuguese illustrators
20th-century Portuguese writers
21st-century Portuguese writers
Portuguese children's writers